Tiago Leite do Amaral (born 6 February 1985), is a Brazilian footballer who currently plays as a forward for Portuguesa-RJ.

Club career
Tiago Amaral joined Portuguesa in April 2017. He was the top scorer in the 2016 Campeonato Carioca while playing for Volta Redonda.

Career statistics

Club

Notes

References

External links

1985 births
Living people
Brazilian footballers
Associação Desportiva Cabofriense players
Duque de Caxias Futebol Clube players
Volta Redonda FC players
Esporte Clube Aracruz players
São Cristóvão de Futebol e Regatas players
Olaria Atlético Clube players
Cuiabá Esporte Clube players
Boavista Sport Club players
Associação Atlética Portuguesa (RJ) players
Campeonato Brasileiro Série D players
Campeonato Brasileiro Série C players
Association football forwards
Sportspeople from Rio Grande do Sul